The Minneapolis and St. Louis Railroad Depot in Watertown, South Dakota was built by the Minneapolis and St. Louis Railway (M&StL) in 1911 and served passengers until July 21, 1960.

The depot is a two story brick building with a high pitched slate gable roof and a projecting brick chimney. The Minneapolis and St. Louis Railroad began laying tracks into Watertown in 1884. Passenger service west of Watertown to Conde and Aberdeen ended on January 1, 1950. The final passenger train departed the station for Minneapolis on July 20, 1960, with the train from Minneapolis arriving in Watertown on July 21.

References
 Kant Fischer, Joanita. Minneapolis and St. Louis Railroad Depot (Codington County, South Dakota) National Register of Historic Places Inventory-Nomination Form, 1985. On file at the National Park Service.

Railway stations on the National Register of Historic Places in South Dakota
Watertown, South Dakota
Railway stations in the United States opened in 1911
1911 establishments in South Dakota
Buildings and structures in Watertown, South Dakota
National Register of Historic Places in Codington County, South Dakota
Railway stations closed in 1949
Former railway stations in South Dakota